This is a list of beaches in Pakistan which are notable. Pakistan's southern coastline meets the Arabian Sea, running along the provinces of Sindh and Balochistan.

Sindh 
Karachi

Clifton Beach
French Beach
Hawke's Bay
Ibrahim Hyderi
Korangi Creek
Mubarak Goth
Nathia Gali Beach
Paradise Point
Russian Beach
Sandspit Beach
Turtle Beach  
Tushan Beach  
Cape Monze  
Sunhera Beach  
Devil's Point  
Manora Beach
Blue Sea Resort

Balochistan 

Astola
Astola Islands
Gaddani
Gaddani Beach
Gwadar
Gwadar Beach
Gwadar Bay
Jiwani
Jiwani Bay
Ormara
Ormara Beach
Ormara Turtle Beaches
Kund Malir
Sonmiani
Sonmiani Beach
Surbandar
Surbandar Beachside

References

External links 
List of beaches in Pakistan at 
Top 20 Beautiful Beaches in Pakistan www.crayon.pk

Beaches
Pakistan
Beaches